Amblyjoppa is a genus of wasps belonging to the family Ichneumonidae.

Species

References 

 Biolib
 Catalogue of Life

Ichneumonidae genera
Ichneumonidae